Drona 2010 is a 2010 Indian Malayalam-language neo noir action horror film directed by Shaji Kailas. Mammootty appears in double role supported by Manoj K. Jayan, Kanika, Navya Nair, Suraj Venjaramoodu, Thilakan, Jayan Cherthala, Biju Pappan, Lakshmi Sharma and K. P. A. C. Lalitha. Roles of Mammootty's assistants are played by Bala ,Vijayakumar, and Irshad. Scripted by A. K. Sajan.The film was released on 27 January 2010.

Plot 

Kunjunni, in an inebriated condition arrives on a rainy night to purchase Nelloor Mana, which is believed to be haunted by the ghost of Savithri. Being crazy about old houses and palaces, Kunjunni, who is into real estate business was lured into this deal by Gireeshan, the son of Gupthan Namboothiri, a feudal landlord. In a fight with Kunjunni, his younger son had fallen from the terrace and had got paralyzed below the hips. Now Guptan Namboothiri wants to avenge for it.

Upon reaching the old house, Kunjunni is attacked by the goons of Gireeshan, but he escapes miraculously. An atheist, Kunjunni leads a carefree life away from the traditions of his family and is in love with Thulasimani, the adopted daughter of Pisharody, the old friend of his late father, who was also a famous tantrik. In spite of all the blocks that comes his way, Kunjunni reaches back to own the house. Gireeshan leads him inside and he feels the presence of some supernatural powers inside. While stepping into the pond, he feels trapped inside and as if someone was pulling him down. The dead body of Kunjunni was found at the nearby river on next day.

Pattazhi Madhavan Nambooothiri, his brother, who is also a strong tantrik and Sanskrit professor decides to probe the reasons that caused his brother's death. Madhavan Namboothiri suspects Gireeshan's role in it. Madhavan is married to Mithra, the daughter of Gupthan Namboothiri who married Madhavan against his wishes. It was Kunjunni who helped Madhavan and Mithra get married despite the enmity between the two families. Upon learning about his brother's death, Madhavan goes to Nelloor Mana and along with his three disciples starts residing there. It is also revealed that Madhavan's father also had died by drowning in the pond long back while he was there to perform a vasthu puja. Madhavan and his disciples come across several supernatural experiences inside the house. Madhavan finds several vastu doshas existing in the house that had caused a series of accidents including fire tragedies that had killed several members long back. Madhavan brings in the youngest member of Uliyanoor Thachan to rectify the errors. Along with that, he also does several pujas to clear up the mess. However, things get more complicated with the arrival of Thulasimani. She is haunted by an unseen force from time to time. It is revealed that Thulasi is none other, but the daughter of Harinarayanan Namboothiri, who was killed in a fire accident years back. Automatically, the ownership of the house comes into the hands of Thulasi. One night, one of the disciples of Madhavan is killed. The same night, Madhavan is attacked by Jayan, the son of Gupthan Namboothiri. The next day, Jayan's corpse is found in the river. Beeran, the SP of police arrives at the spot for investigation and is shocked to find another corpse, that is of Vishahari, a trusted left hand of Jayan in the house.

Madhavan explains Beeran the secrets of the supernatural things happening inside. A secret passage exists from the pond to the river that carries anyone who steps into the pond to the river. He also explains, that it was not any supernatural element that had killed his disciple, but was Jayan and Vishahari, who were in the house to hunt down Madhavan. The next night, Madhavan is getting prepared for the final puja to clear up the whole mess, when Gireeshan arrives in the garbs of Savitri. It is revealed that Gireeshan is suffering from multiple personality disorder and it is him, whom many people mistook to the ghost of Savitri. Madhavan physically overpowers Gireeshan and defeats him, thereby putting an end to the mystery of the ghost. He thus moves back from Nelloor Mana, handing the key to Thulasimani.

Cast

 Mammootty in (double role)
Pattazhi Madhavan Namboothiri
Pattazhi Kunjunni 
 Manoj K. Jayan as Maniyankottu Gireeshan
 Kanika as Thulasimani
 Thilakan as Maniyankottu Guptan Namboothiri
 Bala as Anandapadmanabhan
 Irshad as Aadishankaran
 Vijayakumar as Aadikeshavan
 Navya Nair as Maniyankottu Mithra Andarjanam, Madhavan Nambiothiri's wife
 Dhanya Mary Varghese as Maniyankottu Savithri
 Lakshmi Sharma as Maniyankottu Gauri
 K. P. A. C. Lalitha as Aathiyamma, mother of Madhavan and Kunjunni
 Jayan Cherthala as Maniyankottu Jayan
 T. P. Madhavan as Pisharody, foster father of Thulasi
 Suraj Venjaramood as Uliyannoor Raghu Uthaman
 Devan as SP Beeran Sahib IPS
 Ranjini Jose as Jyolsna
 Kollam Thulasi as Vaidyan
 Narayanankutty as Kizhakkedam
 Kunchan as Ashokan, Maniyankottu member
 Biju Pappan as Choonda Vasu
 Abu Salim as Hari
 Kiran Raj as Rajeevan
 Subair as Driver Kunjambu
 Saddiq as CI Abdulla
 V. K. Sreeraman as Pattazhi Sankaran Namboothiripad, father of  Madhavan and Kunjunni
 Nandhu as Nelloor Harinarayanan Namboothiri, father of Thulasi
 Balachandran Chullikkadu as Nelloor Karanavar
 Yathikumar
 V.K Baiju
 Kulappulli Leela as Jameela

Reception 
The movie received positive to mixed reviews from Critics, Sify.com wrote "start rolling the viewer wonders what the makers of this film trying to tell amidst all the ruckus and mayhem on screen for more than two and a half painful hours. If you are a fan of Mammootty, watch some of his brilliant movies from the past or even the recent Paleri Manikyam to have a feel of his genius. Sadly, this one is nowhere in that league" K C Asok from Deccan Herald Wrote that "The nearly three-hour saga is a virtual shindig. Actors suffer due to poor dubbing and the perplexing plot make the cast and situations appear contrived." Paresh C Palicha from Rediff.com wrote "All in all, the actors deserve a better film than this ho-hum film." Dhrona old fashioned story  the film revolves around a mysterious old mansion believed to be haunted by a ghost.

References

External links 
 

2010 films
2010s Malayalam-language films
Indian ghost films
Films shot in Ottapalam
Films shot at Varikkasseri Mana
Films directed by Shaji Kailas